Alexander Shoumatoff (born November 4, 1946) is an American writer known for his literary journalism, nature and environmental writing, and books and magazine pieces about political and environmental situations and world affairs.  He was a staff writer at The New Yorker magazine from 1978 to 1987, a founding contributing editor of Outside magazine and Condé Nast Traveler, and was the senior-most contributing editor to Vanity Fair since its re-inception in 1986 through 2015 before he pseudo retired. He is known for reporting from the most remote corners of the world.  Shoumatoff was called "the farthest flung of the far flung writers" by The New Yorker and "one of our greatest story tellers" by Graydon Carter.

Career highlights include Vanity Fair's article about Cornelius Gurlitt who was discovered with hundreds of paintings from art theft and looting during World War II from Nazi plundering; a 1986 article for Vanity Fair magazine about the mountain gorilla advocate Dian Fossey in 1986 in Rwanda which became the film Gorillas in the Mist; one of the first international articles about the Brazilian musician Caetano Veloso in 1984 for The New Yorker; tracing the origin of AIDS for Vanity Fair which became his book African Madness; a profile of the organization Product Red led by U2 front man Bono; and his arrest in 2008 for trespassing at the Bohemian Grove in Monte Rio, California in 2008 that was featured in Page 6 of The New York Post and Vanity Fair about how members of the Grove were attempting to log old-growth redwood trees, but became much more than that after news of his arrest was picked up by news outlets.  
He has 10 published books and since 2001 has been the editor of a web site, "Dispatches From The Vanishing World", devoted to "documenting and raising awareness about the planet's rapidly disappearing natural and cultural diversity". Hundreds of pages of his writing are posted on the site. His eleventh book, The Wasting of Borneo: Dispatches From A Vanishing World," will be published by Beacon Press in April, 2017.

Ethnicity and ancestry
Shoumatoff descends from a family of the Russian nobility he traced back dozens of generations in his 1982 book, Russian Blood. The Schoumatoff family were originally Baltic German Schumacher and had migrated to St. Petersburg and been enobled under Peter the Great. His paternal grandmother, Elizabeth Shoumatoff, was a portrait artist who was painting President Franklin Roosevelt when he collapsed before her with a cerebral hemorrhage and she escorted his mistress Lucy Rutherford away from the scene before the media arrived.  Her brother (Shoumatoff's great uncle) Andrey Avinoff, was a "gentleman-in-waiting" to the Tsar at the time of the Soviet Revolution, was an artist, was the world top lepidopterist who was fictionalized by Nabokov in Dar (The Gift), and became the director of the Carnegie Museum of Natural History in Pittsburgh from 1925 to 1945, and was profiled before his death in 1948 by The New Yorker.  His paternal grandfather, Leo Shoumatoff, was the business manager of Igor Sikorsky's aircraft company, which developed the helicopter and the first passenger airplane. His other grandfather was a Colonel in the Empress's cavalry guard. His father Nicholas Shoumatoff was an engineer who designed many of the paper mills around the world, was an entomologist, and well-known alpine ecologist who wrote the books Europe's Mountain Center and Around the Roof of the World, whose obituary was featured in The New York Times.

Childhood and education
Shoumatoff was born in Mount Kisco, New York. He grew up in the 1950s in Bedford, New York, an exurban enclave of old-line WASPs that is now mostly inhabited by famous people and  business leaders. He went to the local country-day school, Rippowam School, where he later taught middle-school science in his mid-twenties. Upon his graduation from the eighth grade, the family moved to London and began to spend summers in Switzerland's Bernese Oberland. His father, a passionate mountain climber, took Shoumatoff and his older brother Nick up major peaks in the Alps.  When he was four, his parents put him in a summer camp in Gstaad, Switzerland, where he learned to speak French.

Shoumatoff did his secondary schooling at St. Paul's School, a then all-boys boarding school in Concord, New Hampshire, where he was at the top of his class and the captain of the squash team and was friends with, and eventually profiled in 1996, John Kerry. When he was 16, impressed with recordings by the South Carolina blues man Pink Anderson, he bought a guitar and wandered to the Folklore Center in Greenwich Village, New York, where Izzy Young sent him to Harlem to take lessons from the Reverend Gary Davis.  Davis would have a huge impact on Shoumatoff and would become the subject of Shoumatoff's first published magazine piece.

He was admitted to Harvard University.  He studied poetry writing with Robert Lowell in a class that included fellow literary journalist Tracy Kidder and was on the Harvard Lampoon. His senior year roommates included Douglas Kenney, founder of National Lampoon and co-scriptor of Animal House and Caddyshack.

Early writing and music career
Graduating into the turbulence of the late Vietnam War and with influence from Bob Dylan, Shoumatoff aspired to be a songwriter. After a stint on The Washington Post as a night police reporter, and with a draft classification of I-A, he enlisted into a Marine Corps reserve intelligence unit that trained him to be parachuted behind the Iron Curtain to melt into the local population. He was given Russian Language schooling in Monterey, California. There, however, he fell in with the psychedelic counterculture of the late 1960s. He turned to his New York City guitar teacher, the Reverend Gary Davis with his predicament, and Davis made him a minister in a heated moment in a store-front church in Harlem. This enabled him to get an honorable, IV-D discharge from the Marines (the D standing for Divinity) and bypass having to go to Vietnam.

In 1969, rather than returning to the Washington Post and becoming its Moscow correspondent which the newspaper's editor Benjamin Bradlee had offered, Shoumatoff chose to "drop out" with his girlfriend and they moved to an old farm in New Hampshire. He taught French at a local college and drove a school bus and became engrossed in nature. Breaking up with the girl that fall, he drifted to northern California hanging out on a succession of communes and playing music around bonfires and writing more songs. There, he sold his profile of Gary Davis to Rolling Stone and got a song-writing contract with Manny Greenhill, the manager of Joan Baez, Joni Mitchell, Muddy Waters, and Doc Watson. He went to New York City to perform his songs but ended up instead writing for magazines, starting with the Village Voice. He developed a piece on Florida into his first book, Florida Ramble, and married his editor's assistant. The newlyweds lived in the Marsh Sanctuary in Mount Kisco, where he became the resident naturalist. The marriage lasted only two years, and the heartbroken Shoumatoff, after turning in his second book, a natural and cultural history of Westchester County, New York, left for the Amazon Rainforest. There, he spent nine months, getting to a remote Yanomamo village that no one from the outside world had set foot in, and nearly dying of falciparum malaria. His second book on the experience,The Rivers Amazon, was published by Sierra Club Press and was compared by reviewers with the classic exploration books on the Amazon by Theodore Roosevelt and Henry Walter Bates.

Returning to Mount Kisco with a Brazilian wife, he learned that his Westchester book had been taken by The New Yorker and joined its staff in 1978. Shoumatoff established himself as "consistently one of the farthest-flung of the New Yorker's far-flung correspondents", as The New York Times described him, and he wrote pieces on pygmies in the Ituri Forest, lemurs of Madagascar, and traced the legend of Amazon women to a tributary of the Amazon called the Nhamunda, which no white person had visited since a Frenchman in 1890.

Writing and journalistic techniques
Shoumatoff is known for his style of "long fact writing" which was developed at The New Yorker under the editorship of William Shawn. Shawn encouraged his writers to pursue their interests in exhaustive detail, a practice used to provide comprehensive reporting about often little-known but fascinating and important subjects, and to fill the weekly magazine's pages. Shoumatoff began recording everything that he was told or observed or thought in little red Chinese and later Staples notebooks, and has filled 500 of them with 200,000 pages to date. Shoumatoff attempts to give the best of his ability, "the full picture, in all its complexity and ambiguity," and submits long pieces, much to the consternation of editors.

Most of his books, beginning with Florida Ramble, and continuing to his last published book, Legends of the American Desert, are portraits of a place (a state, a county, a rainforest, a desert) and often originated with a magazine article. They identify and present, in a mixture of travelogue and exposition, elements that Shoumatoff believes make the place the way it is: flora and fauna; natural, cultural, and political history; local dialects and belief systems. His writing is often characterized by a fascination with "the Other", disenchantment with the modern consumer culture, and an insatiable quantity of detail that he developed at the New Yorker. The essayist Edward Hoagland described him as "admirably protean, encyclopedic, and indefatigable, Shoumatoff has the curiosity of an army of researchers and writes like a house afire."  Shoumatoff also appeals to, frequently works with, and his work often crosses with, work in cultural anthropology. He works often with specialists in species, cultures, and music.

Mid to later life and career

In 1986 Shoumatoff wrote his first piece for Vanity Fair, about the murder of Dian Fossey, which was made into the movie Gorillas in the Mist, and was considered to be one of the newly resurrected magazine's stars by then-editor Tina Brown. He wrote an account of the fall of Paraguay's dictator Alfredo Stroessner, which was the sole subject of Brown's introduction to the issue, and in 1987 attempted to pinpoint the source of the AIDS virus in central Africa which he developed into the book African Madness.  In 1990, his book The World Is Burning about the murder of Chico Mendes was optioned by director/actor Robert Redford.  In the early 1990s, he became interested in golf, and had a column in Esquire Magazine called "Investigative Golf."  Two of his more-famous pieces about golf were one in 1994 which former President Bill Clinton's golf buddies discussed rumors of Clinton's extra-marital affairs prior to the Monica Lewinsky scandal; and another piece about playing with O. J. Simpson's golf buddies who believed Simpson may have hidden the murder weapon in his golf bag. He also profiled Uma Thurman and her father, Buddhist Robert Thurman, for a cover feature in Vanity Fair. During this era, Shoumatoff appeared on the tabloid T.V. shows Inside Edition and E! True Hollywood Story.

Shoumatoff married Rosette Rwigamba, a Tutsi, in 1990.

In 1997, his book Legends of the American Desert: Sojourns in the Greater Southwest, (Knopf, 1997) was named a New York Times notable book and was on Time magazine and New York Posts top ten books of 1997.  He wrote about global warming and the defeat of the USA's endorsement of the Kyoto Protocol in 1997, In 2000, he was selected as the correspondent from Vanity Fair to profile Al Gore, whom he had gone to college with, before the election in a piece that was not published. In 2001, Shoumatoff strengthened his focus on the environment and an interest in creating a written record of these places and/or cultures and species, believing that many of the places that he had been writing about since the 1970s had been drastically changed by the West's appetite for goods, and started his web site, Dispatches From The Vanishing World, with his son Andre.

In the late 2000s Shoumatoff recorded his first musical album with his longtime friend Kate McGarrigle, the mother of Rufus Wainwright and Martha Wainwright, that was featured on NPR's weekend edition of All Things Considered during the Pennsylvania primary for the 2008 primary election.

Shoumatoff has lived in Montreal since 1998 and is still active primarily with magazines such as Smithsonian and is active on speaker circuits about writing.

Books

References

External links
 A Writer Looks At His Career by Alex Shoumatoff, about his early life and changes in American and world society he has lived through, posted on his web site.
 DispatchesFromTheVanishingWorld.Com, Alex Shoumatoff's Web Site
 Alex Shoumatoff biography at VanityFair.Com
 Alex Shoumatoff at the New Yorker

1946 births
American male journalists
American nature writers
American male non-fiction writers
American political writers
The Harvard Lampoon alumni
Living people
American people of Russian descent
People from Mount Kisco, New York